The 2003–04 Eliteserien season ended with Storhamar Dragons claiming their fifth Norwegian title after defeating Vålerenga in double overtime in game 7. Michael Smithurst scored the game winner nearly two minutes into the second extra period in front of 7,405 spectators.

Regular season

Final standings

Statistics

Scoring leaders
The following players led the league in points at the conclusion of the regular season.
GP = Games played; G = Goals; A = Assists; Pts = Points; +/– = Plus/minus; PIM = Penalty minutes

Leading goaltenders
The following goaltenders led the league in goals against average at the conclusion of the regular season.
GP = Games played; TOI = Time on ice (minutes); W = Wins; L = Losses; GA = Goals against; SO = Shutouts; Sv% = Save percentage; GAA = Goals against average

Playoffs
After the regular season, the new standard of eight teams qualified for the playoffs. In the first round, the two highest remaining seeds were drawn against the two lowest remaining seeds; in the second round, the highest remaining seed was drawn against one of the two lowest. In each round the higher-seeded team was awarded home ice advantage, giving them a possible maximum of three home games as opposed to the lower-seeded team's possible maximum of two. Each best-of-five series followed a 1–2–1–1 format: the higher-seeded team played at home for games 2 and 3 (plus 5 if necessary), and the lower-seeded team at home for games 1 and 4 (if necessary).

The final was contested between the Storhamar Dragons and Vålerenga for the second consecutive year. In 2003, the championship had been decided in four straight games when Vålerenga won 4–0 to claim their 22nd title and 18th "double". As in the previous season, the 2004 final was played as a best-of-seven series following a 1–1–1–2–1–1 format. Storhamar, as league champions, were seeded first and played at home for games 2, 4, 5 and 7. They took the lead after winning the first game 2–1 in overtime, but failed to capitalize, losing their first home game 0–4. The third and fourth games were both won by the home side. Game 5 saw Vålerenga achieve an away win in overtime to lead the series 3–2, but Storhamar came back to claim another overtime victory in Oslo and force a seventh, championship deciding game at Hamar OL-Amfi. A record 7,405 spectators turned out for the first game 7 in the history of the Norwegian Championship, in which Storhamar's Michael Smithurst scored the winning goal after 21 minutes and 54 seconds of overtime.

Bracket

Source: hockey.no

Qualifying for UPC-ligaen 2004–05

Final standings

GP = Games played; W = Wins; L = Losses; OTW = Overtime Wins; OTL = Overtime losses; SOW = Shootout Wins; SOL = Shootout losses; GF = Goals for; GA = Goals against; Pts = Points; Q = QualifiedSource: speaker.no

Game log

|-
|Round 1

|-
|Round 2

|-
|Round 3

|-
|Round 4

|-
|Round 5

|-
|Round 6

References

External links
 

GET-ligaen seasons
Norway
GET